Thomas Savage (1608 – 14 February 1682) was a soldier and merchant in colonial New England who attained the rank of major during King Philip's War.

Life
Born in Taunton, Somerset, he was son of William Savage, a blacksmith. Thomas was apprenticed to the Merchant Taylors Company of London on 9 January 1621.

He immigrants to Massachusetts with Sir Henry Vane aboard the Planter in 1635. He was admitted a freeman of Boston in 1636.  The next year he took the side of his mother-in-law, Anne Hutchinson, in the controversy that her teaching excited. He was compelled in consequence to leave the colony, and with William Coddington he and many others founded the settlement of Rhode Island in 1638. Savage was a signer of the Portsmouth Compact. After living there for some time he was permitted to return to Boston.

Military career
He became a member of the Artillery Company of Massachusetts in 1637. In 1639 he was elected as the company's second sergeant and in 1640 he became its first sergeant.  In 1641 he was elected for a one year term as lieutenant of the Military Company of Massachusetts.

He was reelected as lieutenant in 1645 and was elected as captain of the Company in 1651.  He was also re-elected as captain in 1659, 1668, 1675 and 1680.  He was probably the only person to be elected as captain of the Company five times.

Savage served in the colonial militia during King Philip's War, and transported captured Native Americans  into Boston for the purpose of being sold into slavery in Europe.

Political career
On 12 March 1654 he and Captain Thomas Clarke were chosen to represent Boston at the general court, of which he continued a member. He was elected speaker of the assembly in 1637, 1660, 1671, 1677, and 1678. After representing Boston for eight years, he became deputy for Hingham in 1663. In 1664 he, with many other leading citizens, dissented from the policy of the colony in refusing to recognise four commissioners sent by King Charles II to regulate its affairs, and in 1666 he and his friends embodied their views in a petition.

In 1671 he was chosen deputy for Andover, and in 1675 commanded the forces of the state in the first expedition against Metacomet. In 1680 he was commissioned, with others, by the Crown to administer an oath to Sir John Leverett the governor, pledging him to execute the oath required by the act of trade. In 1680 he was elected "assistant" or magistrate, and retained the office until his death on 14 February 1682.

Upon his death his estate had a net value of over 2,500 pounds.

Family
Savage was twice married; first, in 1637, to Faith, daughter of William and Anne Hutchinson. By her he had three sons and two daughters. She died on 20 February 1652. On 15 September he married Mary, daughter of the Rev. Zechariah Symmes of Charlestown, by whom he had eight sons and three daughters. She survived him, and afterwards married Anthony Stoddard.

See also
List of early settlers of Rhode Island

References

Attribution

1608 births
1682 deaths
People from Taunton
Businesspeople from Boston
People from colonial Boston
People of colonial Massachusetts
People of colonial Rhode Island
King Philip's War